Arsiero is a town in the province of Vicenza, Veneto, Italy. It is west SP82 provincial road.

Sources
(Google Maps)

Cities and towns in Veneto